Black Mantra is the fifth full-length studio album by Filipino rock band Wolfgang released in 2001. It is the last album to feature drummer Wolf Gemora.

Track listing

Personnel 
Sebastian "Basti" Artadi (vocals)
Manuel Legarda (guitar)
Ramon "Mon" Legaspi (bass)
Leslie "Wolf" Gemora (drums)

Album Credits 
Executive Producer: Jet Galang
Artists & Repertoire Supervision: Pia Suantabillo
Mixed by: Louie Talan
Album Art Concept and Design: David Lasigameo
Photography by: Tom Epperson
Wolfgang Emblem by: Allan Vekal
Engineered by: Manuel Legarda

Videos 
Meckam
No Falter

Reference

External links 
Wolfgang Website

2001 albums
Wolfgang (band) albums